Penicillium echinulatum is a mold species in the genus Penicillium. It is a source of cellulase.

5-Hydroxymaltol and mycophenolic acid are substances that can be found in P. echinulatum.

References

echinulatum
Fungi described in 1974